Abdul Kader Dabo (born 22 July 1970) is a Malian judoka. He competed in the men's half-middleweight event at the 1992 Summer Olympics.

References

External links
 

1970 births
Living people
Malian male judoka
Olympic judoka of Mali
Judoka at the 1992 Summer Olympics
Place of birth missing (living people)
21st-century Malian people